Al Yamamah Palace is the official residence and office of the King of Saudi Arabia and the seat of the royal court. The palace is located in the western suburbs of Riyadh, it is the main place to receive the Kingdom's senior guests, and also the headquarters for drafting royal decrees. The palace is made of Italian marble floors and intricately carved ceiling and wall panels. King Salman chairs weekly government meetings in the building and often welcomes foreign dignitaries and other VIPs to the palace.

Gallery

References 

Palaces in Saudi Arabia